Seven Cities of Gold is a 1955 historical adventure DeLuxe Color film directed by Robert D. Webb and starring Richard Egan, Anthony Quinn and Michael Rennie, filmed in CinemaScope. It tells the story of the eighteenth-century Franciscan priest, Father Junípero Serra and the founding of the first missions in what is now California. The screenplay is based on the 1951 novel The Nine Days of Father Serra by Isabelle Gibson Ziegler. The tag line of the film was "This is the story of the making ...and the forging...of California...when men chose gold or God...the sword or the Cross".

Plot summary
In 1769, the expedition of Captain Gaspar de Portolà (Anthony Quinn) to California is in search of fabled cities of gold. Its religious advisor, peace-loving missionary Father Junipero Serra (Michael Rennie), wishes to establish good relations with the local natives and to build a string of missions, beginning at San Diego Bay. He is unexpectedly aided when Portola's prideful second in command, Lt. Jose Mendoza (Richard Egan), saves the life of Matuwir (Jeffrey Hunter), the son of the local chief. But when a supply ship fails to appear and the expedition prepares to return to Mexico a failure, Mendoza betrays Matuwir's sister Ula (Rita Moreno), whom he has seduced, resulting in her accidental death by a fall from a cliff. Threatened with annihilation by Matuwir's warriors when both Portola and Father Serra refuse to turn him over, Mendoza prevents war by surrendering himself to Matuwir for torture and execution. As the Spaniards begin to leave, the supply ship appears in the bay as if by a miracle.

Cast
 Richard Egan as Jose Mendoza
 Anthony Quinn as Capt. Gaspar de Portolà  
 Michael Rennie as Father Junipero Serra
 Jeffrey Hunter as Matuwir
 Rita Moreno as Ula
 Eduardo Noriega as Sergeant
 Leslie Bradley as Galves
 John Doucette as Juan Coronel
 Julio Villarreal as	Pilot Vila 
 Jack Mower as Father (uncredited)

Production
The film was based on the book The Nine Days of Father Sierra which was published in 1951. The New York Times called it a "brief, tender, impressive novel." Film rights were bought by 20th Century Fox who in June 1952 announced Charles Brackett would produce and John C Higgins would write the script.

In April 1953 Fox announced the film would be made in CinemaScope and that Richard Breen was working on the script. (NB The Gun and the Cross was the title of a story by Gus Field that Fox purchased in 1951 about the relationship between a priest and a gunfighter. The title appears to have been re-appropriated.)

In October 1954, it was reported Joseph Petracca was writing the script and that the film would star James Mason.

By January 1955 the film was titled Seven Cities of Gold. Brackett was out as producer, replaced by the husband and wife team of Barbara McLean, normally an editor, and Robert D. Webb, who would direct. The stars would be Richard Egan, Michael Rennie, Rita Moreno and Cameron Mitchell. Jeffrey Hunter was cast as a Native American on the basis of his success as a Native American in White Feather, which he had just made for Webb. Mitchell was eventually replaced by Anthony Quinn.

Filming began 15 March 1955 and included location filming in Mexico. It finished by 20 June.

Release
The film was premiered in San Diego.

See also
 List of American films of 1955

References

External links
 
 
 
 

1955 films
1950s historical adventure films
20th Century Fox films
CinemaScope films
American historical adventure films
Films about conquistadors
Films based on American novels
Films directed by Robert D. Webb
Films scored by Hugo Friedhofer
Films set in 1769
Films set in California
1950s English-language films
1950s American films